University of Louisiana may refer to:

 University of Louisiana System, public multi-campus university system
 University of Louisiana at Lafayette
 University of Louisiana at Monroe
 Tulane University of Louisiana, in New Orleans, which was named "The University of Louisiana" 1847–1884
 Xavier University of Louisiana, in New Orleans

Fictional Institutions
 University of Louisiana, a fictional university in Everybody's All-American (film) (1988)

See also
 List of colleges and universities in Louisiana